Essa is a township in Ontario, Canada, west and south of the city of Barrie in Simcoe County. It is bounded by County Road 90 to its north, County Road 27 to its east, and Ontario Highway 89 to its south. The township is well known for its agriculture industry, particularly potato farming. Nearby CFB Borden brings a strong military presence to the area as well, including a high number of Francophone families.

Communities
The main communities of this township are Angus, Thornton, and Baxter. Other small hamlets are Cedargrove, Colwell, Egbert, Elmgrove, Hoe Doe Valley, Ivy, Utopia and West Essa.

Angus is the largest community in Essa Township, and the main access to the neighbouring Canadian Forces Base Borden. It offers services such as Essa Public Library, catholic and public elementary schools, public secondary school, a small shopping centre, many stores, a chamber of commerce and a recreation facility. Angus is located in the northwestern corner of Essa township. Located in Essa's municipal Ward 1, the township councillor for Angus is Pieter Kiezebrink.

Angus is named in honour of Angus Morrison, former Member of the Legislative Assembly for Simcoe North.

Notable residents
Controversial politician Helena Guergis, the former Member of Parliament for Simcoe—Grey, resides in Angus. Her cousin David Guergis was Essa's mayor until 2010.

Local Government
Essa is governed by a Mayor, a Deputy Mayor and three Councillors, with one Councillor representing each of the three municipal wards. The Mayor of Essa represents the town on the Simcoe County Council. As of the 2022 election, the elected council members are:

Mayor: Sandie MacDonald

Deputy Mayor: Michael Smith

Councillors:

 Ward 1: Pieter Kiezebrink
 Ward 2: Henry Sander
 Ward 3: Liana Maltby

Fire, EMS and police services
Township of Essa Fire Department is a fire services staffed by full-time chief, Doug Burgin and deputy chief, Gary McNamara. With 54 volunteer fire fighters at two stations (Angus and Thornton).

Ambulance service is covered by County of Simcoe Paramedic Service station in Angus.

Policing in Essa Township is covered by Ontario Provincial Police Nottawasaga Detachment.

Education
Essa Township has 4 elementary schools and a high school:
Angus Morrison Elementary School (Angus)
Pine River Elementary School (Angus)
Baxter Central Public School (Baxter)
Our Lady of Grace Catholic School (Angus)
Nottawasaga Pines Secondary School (Angus)

These schools are managed by the Simcoe County District School Board and the Simcoe Muskoka Catholic District School Board.

There are also two French Schools accessible to Essa residents, managed by the French Public School Board, Conseil Scolaire  Viamonde.

 Academie La Pinède (Borden)
 Ecole Secondaire Romeo Dallaire (Barrie)

Climate

Demographics 

See also
List of townships in Ontario
List of francophone communities in Ontario

References

External links

Lower-tier municipalities in Ontario
Municipalities in Simcoe County
Township municipalities in Ontario